SMS Möwe (German: Seagull) was a merchant raider of the Imperial German Navy which operated against Allied shipping during World War I.

Disguised as a neutral cargo ship to enable it to get close to targets, the Möwe was effective at commerce raiding, sinking 40 ships in the course of the war.

Early history

Built by the Joh. C. Tecklenborg yard at Geestemünde, she was launched as the freighter Pungo in 1914 and operated by  the Afrikanische Fruchtkompanie  for F. Laeisz of Hamburg. After an uneventful career carrying cargoes of bananas from the German colony of Kamerun to Germany she was requisitioned by the Imperial German Navy for use as a minelayer. Her conversion took place at Imperial shipyard at Wilhelmshaven in the autumn of 1915, and under the command of Nikolaus zu Dohna-Schlodien, she entered service on 1 November that year.

First raiding voyage

Möwe slipped out of Wilhelmshaven on 29 December 1915 for her first task, to set a minefield in the Pentland Firth, near the main base of the British Home Fleet  at Scapa Flow. This was completed in severe weather conditions. A few  days later the pre-dreadnought battleship  struck one of the mines; despite attempts to tow her to safety she sank. Möwe then moved down the west coast of Ireland to France. There she laid another mine field off the Gironde estuary, which sank a further two ships.

This part of her mission complete, Möwe then moved into the Atlantic, operating first between Spain and the Canary islands, and later off the coast of Brazil.

Action of 16 January 1916

The single ship action was fought between a German auxiliary cruiser and a UK cargo ship off the Portuguese islands of Madeira in the Atlantic Ocean.

Möwe was steaming about 120 miles south of Madeira with the merchant steamer , a ship previously captured by the Germans who installed a prize crew and transferred several dozen prisoners of war to. At sunset, lookouts aboard Möwe sighted smoke on the horizon, indicating a ship. Kapitän Dohna-Schlodien ordered Appam to remain behind while he went to investigate. Several minutes later, at about 21:00, Möwe came within distance of making out that the smoke had originated from a large merchant ship, later identified as Clan Mactavish.

By the time Möwe came within close range, it was dark, so Möwe approached cautiously. Using a signal lamp, Dohna-Schlodien asked the cargo ship's name. Clan Mactavish replied by asking that the German ship first identify herself. Dohna-Schlodien signalled that his ship was Author, a Harrison Line ship sailing from Liverpool to Natal. Möwe reportedly looked very similar to Author, which had been sunk by the German Navy a few weeks earlier. Clan Mactavish then signalled her name and that they were returning to Britain from Australia.

Having identified the British ship, Dohna-Schlodien crossed her bow and ordered a halt. Instead of complying, Clan Mactavish changed course and increased speed, hoping to outrun the raider. Möwe fired warning shots and gave chase. Clan Mactavish returned fire with her single gun, but repeatedly missed, and the German ship suffered no damage or casualties. Möwe fired salvoes with her four 150 mm guns. Clan Mactavish sent wireless telegraph distress signals that were received by the armoured cruiser . However, the telegraphist aboard Essex failed to tell his superiors, so no help was sent. After taking several hits topside, Clan Mactavish caught fire and her captain signalled his surrender to Möwe. Möwe then manoeuvred for boarding.

All of the German rounds were hits, apart from the warning shots. A boarding party from Möwe seized Clan Mactavish and removed her surviving crew as prisoners. There were 18 crewmembers killed in or after battle, and five others had been wounded. Clan Mactavishs captain was a Royal Navy reservist and her gun was crewed by two Royal Navy gunners. The remainder of her crew were civilians. This marked a total of more than 500 Allied prisoners of war on Möwe and Appam.

The boarding party scuttled Clan Mactavish with explosive charges.

After sinking Clan Mactavish, Möwe reunited with Appam and set a westward course to avoid any Royal Navy cruisers in the area.

Möwe went on to sink several more Allied ships before returning home. Upon arrival, Kapitän Dohna-Schlodien was awarded the Iron Cross second class. Richard Stumpf records that there were a number of Africans amongst the crew upon this arrival. Felix von Luckner served aboard SMS Möwe before his journey with SMS Seeadler in late 1916 to late 1917.

Interlude as Vineta

In an effort to maintain security, Möwe was renamed Vineta, after another auxiliary cruiser which had been withdrawn from service. In this guise she set out on a series of short cruises during the summer of 1916 to attack Allied shipping off the coast of Norway. This only brought one success, however, before she was ordered in for a refit prior to another sortie into the Atlantic.

Second raiding voyage 
[[File:Sea Raider Moeve - International Newsreel 1920 Ad.jpg|thumb|upright=1.6|Advertisement for the four-part Hearst newsreel The Sea Raider 'Moeve''' (April 1920)]]
Departing  on 23 November 1916, Möwe had even more success on her second cruise into the Atlantic.

On 6 December 1916, she captured and sank the Canadian Pacific Steamship freighter  outbound from Halifax to Liverpool. Mount Temple′s cargo included 700 horses bound for the Canadian Expeditionary Force in France and many crates of dinosaur fossils collected from Alberta's Red Deer River badlands by Charles H. Sternberg destined for the British Museum of Natural History.

In four months she had accounted for another 25 ships totalling . One of these, SS Yarrowdale, was sent as prize to Germany and, as Dohna-Schlodien had recommended, was outfitted as a commerce raider herself. Möwe also retained  as a collier, before arming and commissioning her as the auxiliary Geier. Geier operated in this role for six weeks, accounting for two ships sunk, before being disarmed and scuttled by Möwe prior to returning home. Armed with a single 120mm stern gun, the Otaki fought a gallant but doomed action. The Möwe was hit several times and a serious fire was put out with difficulty. The Otaki, however, was hit some thirty times before sinking. Otakis captain Archibald Bisset Smith was awarded a posthumous Victoria Cross, finally going down in his ship with the British colours still flying”. Five of her crewmen were killed and another ten men were wounded. The damage forced the raider to return course for Germany.

In March 1917 Möwe again successfully ran the British blockade, ironically at the same time as Yarrowdale, now the auxiliary cruiser , was cornered and sunk by the same blockading force. Möwe arrived home safely on 22 March 1917.

Later history

On her return Möwe was taken out of service as a raider, being reckoned too valuable as a propaganda tool to be risked again. She served in the Baltic as a submarine tender, before becoming the auxiliary minelayer Ostsee in 1918. After the Treaty of Versailles, she went to Britain, to be operated by Elders and Fyffes as the freighter Greenbrier. In 1933 she was sold to a German shipping company. As the freighter Oldenburg, it served the route between Germany and occupied Norway in World War II.

On 7 April 1945 she was attacked by Bristol Beaufighters of Coastal Command aircraft from No. 144 Squadron RAF, No. 455 Squadron RAAF, and No. 489 Squadron RNZAF at her moorings sheltering off the coast of Norway—near the village of Vadheim in Sogn og Fjordane county. Following an intense strafing and rocket attack, holed by their rockets and strafed by cannon fire, she burned and sank.

Raiding career

In three raiding voyages Möwe captured and sank 40 ships, grossing in excess of 180,000 GRT. She also laid mines which accounted for two more ships and a capital warship. This made her the most successful German raider in either the First or the Second World War.

 Film 
In 1917 the imperial Bild- und Filmamt in Berlin produced Graf Dohna und seine Möwe, one of the best-known propaganda films of World War I. The distributor was Paul Davidson; part of the production the Projektions-AG »Union« (PAGU), Berlin. The film was first released on 2 May 1917 in the Deutsches Opernhaus (Deutsche Oper Berlin) in Berlin.

See also
Naval warfare of World War I

References

Further reading
 Hoyt, Edwin P. Elusive Seagull (Frewin 1970). .
 Hoyt, Edwin P. The Phantom Raider (Ty Crowell Co. 1969). .
 Schmalenbach, Paul German raiders: A history of auxiliary cruisers of the German Navy, 1895–1945 (Naval Institute Press 1979) .
 Nikolaus zu Dohna-Schlodien: S.M.S. "Möwe", Gotha 1916.
 Nikolaus zu Dohna-Schlodien: Der "Möwe" zweite Fahrt, Gotha 1917.
 Nikolaus zu Dohna-Schlodien: , Ciudad Mexico c. 1917.
 Conde de Dohna-Schlodien: El Möwe, Buenos Aires 1917.
 Nikolaus zu Dohna-Schlodien: A "Möwe" kalandjai, Budapest 1917.
 Reinhard Roehle (ed.): Graf Dohnas Heldenfahrt auf S.M.S. "Möwe". Nach Berichten von Teilnehmern dargestellt. Mit 4 Einschaltbildern, 4 Textabbildungen und 1 Kartenskizze, Stuttgart/Berlin/Leipzig 1916.
 Hans E. Schlüter: S.M.S. "Möwe": ihre Heldenfahrt und glückliche Heimkehr. Nach Berichten von Augenzeugen und anderen Meldungen, Leipzig 1916.
 Graf Dohna: Der „Möwe“ Fahrten und Abenteuer, Stuttgart/Gotha 1927.
 Kapitän zur See a. D. Hugo von Waldeyer-Hartz: Der Kreuzerkrieg 1914–1918. Das Kreuzergeschwader. Emden, Königsberg, Karlsruhe. Die Hilfskreuzer, Oldenburg i. O. 1931.
 Eberhard von Mantey: Die deutschen Hilfskreuzer, Berlin 1937.
 John Walter: Die Piraten des Kaisers. Deutsche Handelszerstörer 1914–1918, Stuttgart 1994.
 Albert Semsrott: Der Durchbruch der "Möwe". Selbsterlebte Taten und Fahrten von Kapitän Albert Semsrott, Stuttgart 1928.
 Otto Mielke: S M Hilfskreuzer "Möwe". Der erste Blockade-Durchbruch. SOS Schicksale deutscher Schiffe, Vol. 125, München 1957.
 Otto Mielke: Hilfskreuzer "Möwe" (2. Teil). SOS Schicksale deutscher Schiffe, Vol. 130, München 1957.

External links

 Count Dohna and His SeaGull
 Marauders of the Sea, German Armed Merchant Raiders During World War I - Möwe
 What Lies Beneath: The D/S Oldenburg Expedition, Vadheim, Norway 2005
 Count Dohna and his "Möwe"'', German film from 1917 with English titles 
 Audacity & Gold Bars - The First Voyage Of The SMS Möve I THE GREAT WAR Special
 The story of SMS Möwe 

1914 ships
Maritime incidents in 1917
Maritime incidents in April 1945
Ships sunk by British aircraft
World War I commerce raiders
World War I cruisers of Germany
World War II shipwrecks in the North Sea
Auxiliary cruisers of the Imperial German Navy
Naval battles of World War I involving the United Kingdom
Naval battles of World War I involving Germany
Atlantic operations of World War I
Conflicts in 1916
January 1916 events